Akeem Arta Shavers (born January 8, 1990) is a former American football running back. Shavers played college football at Purdue.

Early life
Shavers was born to Catena Shavers and Jamie Duncan. He attended Redwater High School in Redwater, Texas. As a member of the football team, Shavers didn't move to the running back position until he was a senior. He competed in five games amassing 1118 rushing yards and 18 touchdowns before being sidelined with a season ending injury.

College career

Independence C.C.
After high school, Shavers attended Independence Community College in Independence, Kansas where he played football. Shavers ran for just 235-yards on 64 carries with two touchdowns. With the staff at Independence making changes after the 2008 season, Shavers decided to transfer.

Tyler J.C.
In 2009, Shavers transferred Tyler Junior College in Tyler, Texas. During the 2009 season at Tyler, Shavers redshirted due to his coach missing the out-of-state/transfer list. With the starting running back spot belonging to Don Brown, Shavers was worked out at defensive back just to get on the field. Shavers played in 6 of the Apaches 8 games during the 2010 season, receiving only 50 carries and 4 touchdowns as the backup running back. Shavers productive season at Tyler netted him 2nd Team All-Conference honors.

Purdue
Shavers committed to Purdue University on December 6, 2010. Shavers was not heavily recruited, and as Purdue was the first FBS scholarship offer he received. Which brought on a stream of offers from other FBS and FCS programs.

Statistics

Professional career

Tampa Bay Buccaneers
On April 29, 2013, Akeem Shavers was signed as an undrafted free agent by the Tampa Bay Buccaneers. He was released on May 6, 2013.

New England Patriots
On May 7, Shavers was claimed off waivers by the New England Patriots. And then later released.

Edmonton Eskimos
Shavers signed with the Edmonton Eskimos of the Canadian Football League (CFL) in early spring of 2015. He spent his first few weeks on the teams practice squad and was later activated as a cornerback where he ultimately made the active roster. Due to injuries in the Edmonton backfield, Shavers was moved back to running back where he was able to contribute to the championship season.

References

External links
Tampa Bay Buccaneers bio
Purdue Boilermakers bio

1990 births
Living people
American football running backs
Edmonton Elks players
Ottawa Redblacks players
People from Texarkana, Texas
Players of American football from Texas
Purdue Boilermakers football players
Tampa Bay Buccaneers players
Tyler Apaches football players
Independence Pirates football players